Henry J. Mullin (1862–1937) was a Major League Baseball outfielder. He played for the 1884 Washington Nationals in the American Association and Boston Reds in the Union Association. He played in the New England League in 1885–1886.

Sources

1862 births
1937 deaths
19th-century baseball players
Baseball people from New Brunswick
Boston Blues players
Canadian emigrants to the United States
Major League Baseball outfielders
Washington Nationals (AA) players
Boston Reds (UA) players
Major League Baseball players from Canada
Newburyport Clamdiggers players
Sportspeople from Saint John, New Brunswick